"Come Through" is a duet by American R&B singers H.E.R. and Chris Brown, released on April 23, 2021, through RCA Records, as the fourth single from her debut studio album Back of My Mind (2021). It was fully written by H.E.R. and Brown, and produced by Cardiak, Mike Will Made It and Mr. Wu10.

Composition
"Come Through" is an R&B slow jam where the singers trade lines about wanting the other to cancel their plans for a possible late-night sneaky link with a close circle of friends who are looking to "get faded".

Live performances
On September 20, 2021, H.E.R. and Brown performed the song live together for the first time, marking Brown's first live performance following the beginning of COVID-19 restrictions

Music video
The music video was released on May 13, 2021. Throughout the music video, H.E.R. and Chris Brown are seen dancing with their respective partners who appear to be apprehensive about what's going on, ending up dancing together flirtatiously in a cabin setting.

Charts

Weekly charts

Year-end charts

Certifications

References

H.E.R. songs
RCA Records singles
Songs written by Cardiak
2021 singles
2021 songs
Chris Brown songs
Songs written by Chris Brown
2020s ballads
Contemporary R&B ballads